Arabic Mathematical Alphabetic Symbols is a Unicode block encoding characters used in Arabic mathematical expressions.

Block

History
The following Unicode-related documents record the purpose and process of defining specific characters in the Arabic Mathematical Alphabetic Symbols block:

References 

Unicode blocks